Anja Jaenicke (born 9 October 1963) is a German actress working mostly in German television and film.

Selected filmography
 1973: Was sagst du dazu?: "Heimkind" (TV)
 1979: David
 1980: Tatort: "Herzjagd" (TV)
 1982: Ein Stück Himmel (TV miniseries)
 1982: Tatort:  (TV)
 1982: Hellseher wieder Willen (TV series, 8 episodes)
 1983: Hanna von acht bis acht (TV film)
 1983: 
 1983: Landluft (TV series, 18 episodes)
 1984: Derrick: "Das Mädchen in Jeans" (TV)
 1984: Mensch Bachmann (TV series, 6 episodes)
 1984: The Old Fox: "Von Mord war nicht die Rede" (TV)
 1985: Die Försterbuben (TV film)
 1985: Die Unbekannten im eigenen Haus (TV film)
 1985: Abschied in Berlin (TV film)
 1985: Die Küken kommen
 1985: Derrick: "Raskos Kinder" (TV)
 1986: Tatort: "Die kleine Kanaille" (TV)
 1986: Wahnfried
 1987: 
 1987: The Old Fox: "Alibi Mozart" (TV)
 1988: The Old Fox: "Der Freispruch" (TV)
 1990–94: Diese Drombuschs (TV series, 18 episodes)
 1990: Hotel Paradies (TV series, 9 episodes)
 1991: Weißblaue Geschichten: "Der Kakadu" (TV)
 1992: SOKO München: "Jedes Rennen gegen den Tod" (TV)
 1994: Tatort: "Der Rastplatzmörder" (TV)
 1997: Röpers letzter Tag (TV film)
 2016: The Mirror Image of Being (director)

Awards
Bavarian Film Award,
Bambi Award,
Deutscher Darstellerpreis

2018 Distinguished Visionary of the Year Award - The VedIQ Guild Foundation

Theater
 1980 "The merry wives of Windsor" W.Shakespeare
 1982 "Stella" J.W.Goethe
 1983 "The little girl at the end of the lane" Nicolas Gessner

Writings
 2002 "Das Gewicht meiner Frau" Essays
 2007/8 "Eagelsdance"/WGA screenplay
 2009 "Die Nabelschnur" novel
 2010 "The Umbilical Cord" screenplay
 2014 "Ajna-The Book of Imortality"
 2014 "The Perfect Job"WGD Treatment 
 2015 " Genius" AKA documentary

External links
 

German film actresses
German television actresses
20th-century German actresses
1963 births
Living people
Actresses from Berlin